5. Kolonne was an organization using violence and sabotage to oppose the occupation of Denmark by German forces during the Second World War.  The organization was formed and based in Aarhus and with some 100 members it was one of the larger resistance groups in that area in the later years of the war. The group was created in response to the destruction of the resistance groups in Jutland by the Gestapo between late 1943 and the summer of 1944. The group functioned from June 1944 to the end of the occupation in May 1945.

Background 
The Danish resistance was in the early years of the occupation dominated by communists, forced underground when the Danish government signed the Communist Law on 22 August 1941. In Aarhus there were a number of such groups, focused on disrupting production, telecommunications and transport networks. Generally the resistance groups had become increasingly active over the years as their members grew in numbers, gained experience and developed networks. Supporting the sabotage groups were groups focused on receiving supplies through allied airdrops, so-called receiver-groups, a network which had also taken time to develop. By 1943 weapons and supplies were arriving with regularity and communications had been established with the central resistance command and contacts in England.

On 13 December 1943 the British paratrooper Jakob Jensen was caught by the Gestapo in Aarhus. During interrogation he supplied information about the networks of receiver groups in Jutland which resulted in many groups being destroyed, including the Hvidsten Group whose members were arrested on March 11, 1944. These events effectively crippled the resistance movement throughout the peninsula as supplies dried up. In Aarhus the resistance groups faced another problem as Grethe Bartram from the communist and resistance environment in Aarhus was hired as an informant by the Gestapo in March/April 1944. Bartram in total informed on some 50 resistance members leading to many groups in and around the city being dismantled by German authorities, including the Samsing Group in June 1944.

The events in the 6 months from December 1943 to June 1944 had effectively wiped out the leadership of the resistance in Jutland and stopped resistance operations in Aarhus. The city was, however, an important seaport and rail hub for the German war effort with troops and supplies arriving frequently from Germany to be shipped out through the Port of Aarhus to Oslo and Riga. German authorities had until the Invasion of Normandy on June 6, 1944 also been concerned that an allied invasion might take place in Jutland and had extended the Atlantic Wall along its west coast while concentrating administrative institutions in the peninsula to prepare defenses. The German headquarters for Denmark was moved from Copenhagen to Silkeborg in November 1943, the Gestapo headquarters for Jutland was moved to Aarhus in September 1943 and the supply headquarters for Denmark was moved to Aarhus in October 1943. Combined these factors had made Aarhus an area of particular interest for the resistance movement and it was considered a priority to re-establish new groups that could disrupt German operations.

In the spring of 1944 lieutenant commander Ernst Fisker from the 3rd Field Artillery Brigade, stationed in Aarhus' Langelandsgade Barracks prior to the war, came into contact with the resistance movement in Aarhus. He was encouraged by the commander of the resistance in Jutland to take command of any units in Aarhus, build up a new command structure and develop sabotage groups that could interfere with German operations, especially the railway.

Formation 
The first groups in the new organization were formed over the early summer of 1944. Initially one group was to obtain supplies while two others were sabotage groups, primarily intended to target infrastructure; in particular the railway and port. The first shipment of weapons was collected in July and the first operation against the railway occurred later that month when the rail line to Randers was bombed as a means of testing equipment. In August the Holger Danske resistance group sent a representative, Jens Lillelund, to help build up the new groups and the overall command structure. Through 1944 the organization was gradually expanded with groups specialized in attacks on production and repair facilities.

In the fall of 1944 it was considered a possibility that fighting might reach Denmark and a new wing was established within 5 Kolonne, the Demolition Groups. The intent of these groups was to destroy vital infrastructure in the event of an allied invasion so as to isolate and immobilize the German garrison in Aarhus. Contact was made with groups in other cities and towns throughout Jutland and demolition groups were set up under the central command of 5 Kolonne.

Organization
5 Kolonne was organized around a system of small independent groups, composed of typically 3 members, that primarily interacted with a central commander but rarely with each other. 

The external demolition groups included groups in Randers, Tilst, Viborg, Silkeborg, Odder, Grenå and Aalborg. The sabotage groups were generally made up of people who worked in specific locations. One group was entirely made up of workers from the harbor, another of DSB personnel and another of workers from the electricity company.

Operations

1944
The group performed about 100 acts of sabotage between September 1944 and May 1945. The harbor groups sank or destroyed three ships and damaged or destroyed some 50 factories or businesses. 3 members of the group died during different operations and memorial stone has been erected in Tranbjerg for two of them.

1945

References 

Publications

Danish resistance groups
Denmark in World War II
History of Aarhus
World War II resistance movements